Walter Prager (2 April 1910 - 1984) was a Swiss alpine skier.

At the 1931 World Championship in Mürren, Prager became the first World Champion in downhill skiing. He also won the 1933 downhill championship.

Later on, Prager successfully coached the Dartmouth Ski Team both before and after World War II.  During the war, he was drafted and was one of the first soldiers to join the 10th Mountain Division.

References

1910 births
1984 deaths
Swiss male alpine skiers
20th-century Swiss people